The Qimei Lighthouse / Cimei Lightouse is a lighthouse in Qimei / Cimei Township, Penghu County, Taiwan.

History
The lighthouse was built in 1939. It was the last lighthouse built by the Japanese government. Originally, it uses acetylene for its power before switching to electricity in 1964. The lighthouse will be opened for public at the end of 2015.

Technical details
The lighthouse has focal plane of 41 meters, in which two white flashes every 10 seconds. The building structure has an 8-meter concrete post sitting atop of 1-story concrete keeper's house. Due to its location at the southern tip of Qimei Island, the lighthouse is used not only for navigation, but also for fishery resources.

See also

 List of tourist attractions in Taiwan
 List of lighthouses in Taiwan

References

External links
 Maritime and Port Bureau MOTC

1939 establishments in Taiwan
Lighthouses completed in 1939
Lighthouses in Penghu County